The Filder (plural) – also Filder Plain – is a natural region (major unit no. 106) of the Swabian Keuper-Lias Land within the South German Scarplands.

They form a gently rolling, fertile plateau in the German state of Baden-Württemberg, which extends over the western half of the county of Esslingen and the southern part of the borough of the state capital of Stuttgart. Geologically it was formed by the transformation of a fault zone from the Lias period.

Hills 

Among the hills of the Filder are the:
 Bernhartshöhe, near Vaihingen by the 4-way motorway intersection, the highest point in the borough of Stuttgart
 Bopser, here is the Stuttgart TV Tower and the Waldau Sports Centre (Sportzentrum Waldau) (including the Gazi-Stadion auf der Waldau, home ground of Stuttgarter Kickers football team)

 Frauenkopf, location of the Stuttgart Telecommunication Tower
 Raichberg (ca. ), Stuttgart-Ost, location of the Stuttgart Transmission Tower

External links 
 Schutzgemeinschaft Filder e. V.
 Natur- und Umweltschutz Filderstadt – 2009: Spezialthema Boden (pdf; 2,3 MB) Zusammensetzung des Bodens auf den Fildern, archäologische Funde uvm. Retrieved 5 July 2010

!
Regions of Baden-Württemberg
Special Areas of Conservation in Germany
Geography of Stuttgart
Esslingen (district)